Karen Burke is an American legal scholar and Richard B. Stephens Eminent Scholar Chair in Taxation and Professor of Law at the University of Florida Levin College of Law.
Previously she was Warren Distinguished Professor of Law at the University of San Diego School of Law.

Books
 Federal Income Taxation of S Corporations, 3d ed. (Foundation Press, forthcoming 2022) (with John K. McNulty)
 Partnership Taxation, 4th ed. (Aspen Law & Business, forthcoming 2021) (with George K. Yin) 
 Federal Income Taxation of Partners and Partnerships, 6th ed. (West Group, 2020) 
 Federal Income Taxation of Corporations and Stockholders, 8th ed. (West Group, 2019)
 Partnership Taxation, 3d ed. (Aspen Law & Business, 2017) (with George K. Yin)
 Corporate Taxation, 2d ed. (Aspen Law & Business, 2016) (with George K. Yin)

References

External links
Karen Burke 

Living people
University of Florida faculty
Stanford Law School alumni
Harvard University alumni
Smith College alumni
University of San Diego faculty
American women academics
American legal scholars
Year of birth missing (living people)
Boston University School of Law alumni